A jackass is a male donkey, or a person who is rude or foolish.

Jackass may also refer to:

Entertainment
 Jackass (franchise), an American reality series
 Jackass: The Movie, the first film in the Jackass film series
 Jackass: The Game, a 2007 video game based on the Jackass television show and film series
 Jackass Mail, 1942 American film

Music
 "Jack-Ass" (song), a 1997 song by Beck
 "Jackass", a 2000 song by Green Day from Warning
 "Jackass", a 2001 song by Bloodhound Gang from the movie Jay and Silent Bob Strike Back

Places
 Jackass Aeropark, an airport
 Jackass Ski Bowl, alpine ski area in northern Idaho (1967–73), now Silver Mountain
 Jackass Mountain, an infamous stretch of the Cariboo Road through the Fraser Canyon in British Columbia, Canada
 Jackass Hill, an elevation in New York.
 Jackass Flats, Nevada, former nuclear-test site
 Jackass Lane, a street in Anchorage, Alaska whose name was changed in the 1980s due to frequent street sign thefts

Other
 Jackass penguin, an alternative name for the African penguin, Spheniscus demersus
 Laughing jackass, a bird, now laughing kookaburra
 Jackass morwong, a fish
 Jackass, an insult for a obnoxious rude person
 Jackass-barque, ship type
 Jackass rabbit, better known as jackrabbit

See also
 Jerkass, a phrase that Homer Simpson says, specifically "Outta my way, Jerkass!"